The amethyst dancer (Argia pallens) is a damselfly of the family Coenagrionidae, native from southwestern North America south to Guatemala.

References

External links
 Argia pallens description and photo

Coenagrionidae
Insects described in 1902